The Idea is a musical with words and music by Joseph Hart.

The original production, featuring Frederick Hallen and Joseph Hart, was produced by Hallen in Boston in the fall 1892. It then opened in New York City at the Fourteenth Street Theatre on April 9, 1893 and was still playing there in October.

In 1894, a revival played in Chicago.

Roles and New York cast 
The opening night cast in New York was as follows:
Peach Blow:  Fannie Bloodgood
Mrs. Morton Howes/Johnny Get:  Mollie Fuller
Nellie Dogood:  Margueritte De Mar
Mary B. Quiet:  Carrie De Mar
Gedney Howes:  Loretta Morgan
Victoria Howes:  Edith Murray
Marlborough Howes:  Jennie Grovini
Morton Howes:  J. Aldrich Libbey
Gilsey Howes:  Charles B. Lawlor
Carl Pretzel:  Al. Wilson
Reed Wallpaper:  Albert Hawthorne
Saunders:  Larry Dooley
Wells Fargo: Richard Reab
Policeman:  Charles Kettler
Hoffman Howes:  Frederick Hallen
Olean Bradford:  Joseph Hart

Songs 

Based on the sheet music, the songs included:

When the Man in the Moon Goes To Sleep
That Was Me
A Dream In the Old Arm-Chair
I Have No Heart, It Still Belongs To Thee
I Love You In Spite Of It All - by Charles K. Harris

References

External links

1893 musicals